Below are the rosters for the 1993 Copa América tournament in Ecuador, from 15 June to 4 July 1993. The competition featured the debut of two teams (Mexico and the United States) and as a result the tournament format changed to one with three groups of four teams each.

Group A

Ecuador
Head coach:  Dušan Drašković

United States
Head coach:  Bora Milutinović

Uruguay
Head coach: Luís Cubilla

Venezuela
Head coach:  Ratomir Dujković

Group B

Brazil
Head coach: Carlos Alberto Parreira

Gil Baiano was a late injury replacement for the originally selected Luis Carlos Winck 

The player (Nº13)Jose Gildasio Pereira de Matos or Gil Baiano of the Club Bragantino Brazil was replaced due to injury for Luis Carlos Winck of the club Gremio Porto Alegre Brazil before the start of the tournament.

Chile
Head coach: Arturo Salah

Paraguay
Head coach: Alicio Solalinde

Peru
Head coach:  Vladimir Popović

Group C

Argentina
Head coach: Alfio Basile

 Because of the lesion suffered by Darío Franco(Number 8) in Argentina's first match against Bolivia (rupture of tibia and fibula), the CSF authorized to replace him; the coach chose to include José Horacio Basualdo Club Atletico Velez Sarsfield (Argentina) (N°23)
(N°8) Dario Javier Franco MF Real Zaragoza (Spain) 17/01/1969

Bolivia
Head coach:  Xabier Azkargorta

Colombia
Head coach: Francisco Maturana

Mexico
Head coach: Miguel Mejía Barón

References
RSSSF Archive

Squads
Copa América squads